Pierre-Charles Boudot (born 21 December 1992) is a French flat racing jockey.

He was French flat racing Champion Jockey in 2015, 2016 and 2020. Boudot rode Waldgeist to win Europe's biggest race the Prix de l'Arc de Triomphe in 2019.

In May 2021 Boudot has been suspended for three months by the  France Galop as he is under investigation over rape allegation.

Major wins
 France
Prix de l'Arc de Triomphe – 1 – Waldgeist (2019)
Poule d'Essai des Poulains – 1 – Persian King (2019)
Prix de Diane – 2 – Channel (2019), Fancy Blue (2020)
Prix de la Forêt – 3 – One Master (2018, 2019, 2020)
Grand Prix de Saint-Cloud – 2 – Waldgeist (2018), Way To Paris (2020)
Grand Prix de Paris – 2 – Gallante (2014), Mogul (2020)
 Prix Jacques Le Marois – 1 – Ésotérique (2015)
 Prix Rothschild – 2 – Ésotérique (2015), Watch Me (2020)
 Critérium de Saint–Cloud – 1 – Waldgeist (2016)
 Prix Jean–Luc Lagardère – 1 – National Defense (2016)
 Prix Vermeille – 1 – Bateel (2017)
Prix Jean Prat – 1 – Intellogent (2018)
Prix Marcel Boussac – 1 – Lily's Candle (2018)
Prix Ganay – 2 – Waldgeist (2019), Mare Australis (2021)
Prix Royal Oak – 1 – Technician (2019)
Prix d'Ispahan – 1 – Persian King (2020)
Prix du Moulin de Longchamp – 1 – Persian King (2020)
Prix de l'Abbaye de Longchamp – 1 – Wooded (2020)
Critérium International – 1 – Van Gogh (2020)

 Great Britain
Sun Chariot Stakes – 1 – Ésotérique (2015)
Coronation Stakes – 1 – Watch Me (2019)
Queen Elizabeth II Stakes – 1 – The Revenant (2020)

 United States
 Breeders’ Cup Filly & Mare Turf – 1 – Audarya (2020)
 Breeders' Cup Mile  – 1 – Order of Australia  (2020)

See also
List of jockeys

References

1992 births
Living people
French jockeys
People from Paray-le-Monial
Sportspeople from Saône-et-Loire